Cobalt disilicide (CoSi2) is an intermetallic compound, a silicide of cobalt. It is a superconductor with a transition temperature of ca. 1.4 K and a critical field of 105 Oe.

References

Cited sources

Cobalt compounds
Transition metal silicides
Fluorite crystal structure